Luis Enrique Gnecco Dessy (born 12 December 1962) is a Chilean actor.

Besides his work in Chilean telenovelas and films (Johnny 100 Pesos, the Academy Award nominated No, El bosque de Karadima, A Fantastic Woman and Neruda), he is internationally known for his performances in HBO's Prófugos and Netflix series Narcos.

Biography 
While studying biology under, among others, Humberto Maturana, Gnecco developed into an actor and a comedian. Afterwards he studied in the Theatre academy of Fernando González.

In 1985 he began to work in telenovelas, such as Amores de mercado, Brujas, and Soltera otra vez. Two years later he started appearing in comedy shows such as De Chincol a Jote, El desjueves (1990–1995), and Na' que ver con Chile. In 2008 he played the lead role in the Chilean version of The Office, The ofis. In 2016, the jury at the 17th Havana Film Festival New York awarded him the Havana Star Prize for "Best Actor" for his role in El bosque de Karadima.

Filmography

Film

Television

Notes

References 

Chilean male film actors
Chilean male television actors
University of Chile alumni
Chilean people of Italian descent
1962 births
People from Santiago
Living people
Chilean male comedians